The Caterpillar C32 is a V12 diesel engine made by Caterpillar Inc.  The engine displacement is 32.1 liters (1959 cubic inches).  The cylinder size is 5.71 inches x 6.38 inches bore/stroke. The engine can produce up to 1900 horsepower at 2300 rpm.  The peak torque of 5532 lb-ft occurs at an engine speed of 1300 to 1800 RPM.
The engine weighs over three tons at 6780 pounds.  The C32 is used in CAT equipment including the 777G mining truck and the D11T bulldozer. It is also sold for use in rail and marine applications, and for other industrial applications such as crushers, pumps, and drills.

Notes

References

Diesel engines
V12 engines